Alcaligenes faecalis is a species of Gram-negative, rod-shaped bacteria commonly found in the environment. It was originally named for its first discovery in feces, but was later found to be common in soil, water, and environments in association with humans. While opportunistic infections do occur, the bacterium is generally considered nonpathogenic. When an opportunistic infection does occur, it is usually observed in the form of a urinary tract infection.

A. faecalis has been used for the production of nonstandard amino acids.

Description
A. faecalis is a Gram-negative bacterium which appears rod-shaped and motile under a microscope. It is positive by the oxidase test and catalase test, but negative by the nitrate reductase test. It is alpha-hemolytic and requires oxygen. A. faecalis can be grown at 37 °C, and forms colonies that lack pigmentation.

Metabolism
The bacterium degrades urea, creating ammonia which increases the pH of the environment. Although A. faecalis is considered to be alkali-tolerant, it maintains a neutral pH in its cytosol to prevent the damaging or denaturing of its charged species and macromolecules.

History
A. faecalis may have been isolated by Johannes Petruschky in 1896, and also described (and they state, the description corrected) in 1919 by Castellani and Chalmers. There was some controversy about the morphology and smell of the organism. In 2001, previously unidentified isolates of Alcaligenes were classified as a new subspecies of A. faecalis: A. faecalis parafaecalis. In 2005, a second subspecies of A. faecalis was described: A. faecalis phenolicus. A. faecalis phenolicus is distinguished by its ability to use phenol as a carbon source.

References

External links
Type strain of Alcaligenes faecalis at BacDive -  the Bacterial Diversity Metadatabase

Burkholderiales
Bacteria described in 1919